Basili Sabatsmindeli was a Georgian calligrapher, monk and writer of the 8th century.

Basili created his works in Palestine and Mar Saba.

His work "დასდებელნი მამისა საბაჲსნი" (dasdebelni mamisa sabaisni) is included in the Mount Sinai chapters of the 10th century.

References

Calligraphers from Georgia (country)
8th-century writers
Christian monks from Georgia (country)
8th-century Christian monks
Eastern Orthodox monks